Ferdinand Denzler (16 November 1909 – 3 July 1991) was a Swiss water polo player. He competed in the men's tournament at the 1936 Summer Olympics. He went on to be a sculptor, and competed in the arts competition at the 1948 Summer Olympics.

References

External links
 

1909 births
1991 deaths
Swiss male water polo players
Olympic water polo players of Switzerland
Water polo players at the 1936 Summer Olympics
People from Leoben
Olympic competitors in art competitions
20th-century Swiss sculptors